The Bacon Super T-6 was a North American AT-6F Texan that was modified during the mid 1950s by the Erle L. Bacon Corporation in an attempt to interest foreign air forces in an upgrade for their T-6 fleets. The aircraft did not receive sufficient interest for production, and only the single conversion was produced.

History
Produced in 1944 and operated by the United States Army Air Forces alongside its brethren, following the end of World War II AT-6F Texan 44-82028 was sold on the civilian market, operating in Iceland for a time before being acquired by Bacon for conversion. Described as appearing "like an illicit hangar affair between a T-33 and a T-6", the conversion consisted of adding the canopy, tip tanks, and tricycle landing gear from a Lockheed T-33 Shooting Star; streamlining of the cowl and wings including jet stack exhaust, augmenter cooling, and a  reduction in wingspan compared to the standard T-6; in addition, the cockpit was upgraded with a revised instrument panel and modernized avionics, and the aircraft's brakes were upgraded.

Bacon hoped to sell the conversion to foreign air forces, many of which operated large fleets of T-6 aircraft; after taxi trials at the end of 1956, it first flew in April 1957, and flight testing was considered generally successful. No interest from its intended customers materialized and the aircraft was sold on the civilian market; it eventually received a paint scheme, believed to have been intended for a role in a movie, resembling that of a Russian fighter aircraft. It was stored at Whiteman Air Park in California, and allowed to deteriorate in the elements, with its registration being cancelled in 2013.

Specifications

See also

References

Super T-6
1950s United States military trainer aircraft
Single-engined tractor aircraft
Low-wing aircraft
Aircraft first flown in 1957